This is a list of current and defunct automobile manufacturers of Poland.

Current manufacturers
 Arrinera (2008–2021)
 Hydrocar (2016–present)
 Leopard Automobile (2005–present)
 Melex (1971–present)

Foreign manufacturers currently building in Poland
 Stellantis, formerly FCA Poland (1992–present)

Former manufacturers
 CWS (1918–1928)
 FSC (1948–present (no longer produces cars))
 FSM (1948–1992)
 FSO (1948–present (no longer produces cars))
 FSR
 Mikrus (1957–1960) (PZL Mielec)
 PZInż (1928–1939)
 Ralf-Stetysz (1924–1929) (K. Rudzki i S-ka)

Former contract manufacturers
 LRL (1818–1948) produced Chevrolet vehicles

Former joint ventures
 FSO-Daewoo (1995–2004)
 Polski Fiat (1932–1939, 1967–1992)

Foreign manufacturers formerly building in Poland
 Intrall Poland (2004–2007)

References

Automotive industry in Poland
Poland